Lydia Kakabadse (born 1955) is a British composer of vocal, choral and chamber music. Her musical style is tonal and modal with influences from chant and early polyphony, Orthodox liturgical music and other non-western music. It also incorporates the Arabic scale with traditional Western harmonies.

Her choral piece Odyssey was commissioned by the Hellenic Institute of Royal Holloway, University of London. In 2015 she was commissioned to write a choral piece, I Remember by her old school, Forest Preparatory School in Altrincham, for performance at an inter-school music event. Two short pieces were performed at the Three Choirs Festival in Gloucester Cathedral in 2019, and her chamber work Concertato was performed at the Chatsworth Arts Festival later the same year. Her chamber work Russian Tableaux was broadcast by BBC Radio 3 to mark International Women's Day in 2015 and 2017.

Compositions 

Kakabadse's work includes:

 Arabian Rhapsody Suite
 As I Sat at the Café
 A Vision
 Cantica Sacra
 Cantus Planus
 Concertato
 Courage
 Dance Sketches
 Eldorado
 Haunted Houses
 I Remember
 Kontakia
 Odyssey
 Recitativo Arioso + Variations
 Russian Tableaux
 Sancte Ioseph
 Spectre of the Maiden Scorned
 Spellbound
 The Coachman's Terror
 The House Where I was Born
 The Mermaid
 Theotokia
 The Phantom Listeners
 The Ruined Maid
 The Song of the Shirt
 The Way through the Woods

Recordings 
 The Phantom Listeners (2011), Naxos
 Cantica Sacra (2016), Divine Art
 Concertato (2017), Divine Art
 Ithaka (2019), Divine Art.

References

External links 
 www.lydiakakabadse.com



Living people
1955 births
British composers